Manydeng is a  boma in  Baidit payam, Bor West County, Jonglei State, South Sudan, about 30 kilometers north of Bor.  The village is located at the southern extent of the sudd, South Sudan's vast central wetlands.

Education
Some of the most prominent schools in Jonglei State are based in Mach-Deng. Mach Deng primary school is one of the oldest in the region and it’s believed that  Abel Alier started school from there according to the locals. 

Baidit Primary school is one of the two primary schools in Mach Deng, it’s located few km from the heart of the town called Dingruot. 
Most state performers from the state National examination come from this school.

Notable residents
akon changkou, South Sudanese Australian model 
Abel Alier Former South Sudanese politician

Demographics
According to the Fifth Population and Housing Census of Sudan, conducted in April 2008, Manydeng  boma had a population of 13,308 people, composed of 6,774 male and 6,534 female residents.

Notes

References 

Populated places in Jonglei State